Ankara Güvercinlik Army Air Base,  is a military airport of the Turkish Army located in Güvercinlik of Etimesgut district,  west of Ankara in central Turkey.

The air base hosts General Staff controlled units, General Directorate of Mapping's aviation unit, Army Aviation School, 1st Army Aviation Regiment and Ankara Gendarmerie Aviation Group. The airport is open to general aviation for civil domestic flights with permission.

History
With the foundation of the Turkish State Airlines Enterprise (DHY), the predecessor of the Turkish Airlines (THY), in 1933, regular domestic passenger flights started the same year between Ankara and Istanbul via a stopover in Eskişehir. The airport in Güvercinlik became the first airport of Ankara.

In 1935, a training and a maintenance service center were established by the Turkish Aeronautical Association at the airport. The center, called Türkkuşu (for "Turkish Bird"), carried out revision services to the DHY in two hangars until its relocation to the nearby airport in Etimesgut in 1945.

On February 13, 1947, the first international passenger flight of the DHY departed from the Güvercinlik Airport for Athens via Istanbul.

Güvercinlik Airport served for the city of Ankara 22 years until 1955 when the civil flights were transferred to the newly completed Esenboğa Airport. Maintenance facilities were relocated to Istanbul Yeşilköy Airport the same year.

The Army Aviation School (Kara Havacılık Okulu), which was established in 1948 at the Turkish Army's Artillery School in Polatlı to train pilots and flight equipment technicians for reconnaissance aircraft and helicopters of the army and the gendarmerie, was deployed in 1958 to Güvercinlik Airport.

Following the re-establishment of the aviation branch of the Turkish Navy in 1968, the first naval helicopter pilots were trained by the Army Aviation Command's flight school at the Güvercinlik Army Air Base.

Legal status
Currently, the air base is owned and operated by the Turkish Army. However, the military airport is open to general aviation for non-scheduled civil domestic flights only with permission according to a "Protocol on the Use of Military Airports by Civil Aviation" signed on July 22, 2002, between the Turkish General Staff and the Ministry of Transport. Civil aircraft, foreign flagged or Turkish, may make use of the maintenance facilities at the base with permission. Aircraft with any foreigner crew member, however, need to obtain a special permission to use the facilities. No staying overnight is allowed at the airport.

Units and equipment stationed
Following units and their equipment are stationed at the air base:
General Staff controlled units
Special Aviation Group Command (Özel Hava Grup Komutanlığı)S-70A helicopters and CN235-100M transporters
GES Aviation Group Command (GES Hava Grup Komutanlığı)CN235-100M transporters and UH-1H, Bell 206L helicopters
General Directorate of Mapping (Harita Genel Müdürlüğü) 
Mapping Aviation Group (Harita Hava Grubu)Beech B200 aircraft
Army Aviation School Command (K.K. Havacılık Okulu Komutanlığı)
Attack Helicopter Squadron (Taarruz Helikopter Taburu) 
1st Flight (1. Filo)Bell AH-1
2nd Flight (2. Filo)Bell AH-1P, Bell TAH-1P Trainer
Helicopter Squadron (Helikopter Taburu) 
1st Flight (1.Bölük)Bell UH-1
2nd Flight (2.Bölük)S-70A 
Air Transport Group (Hava Ulaştırma Grubu)Beech B200, 421C Golden Eagle/Executive Commuter aircraft and UH-1H, Eurocopter AS 532 UL Cougar helicopters
Instruction Flight Command (Kurs Bölük Komutanlığı)
Basic Flying Instruction-Rotating (Temel Uçuş Hareketli)Augusta Bell 206R helicopters
Instrumental Flight Instruction (Aletli Uçus Eğitim)Cessna T-41D to be replaced by Cessna T182T Skylane, Beechcraft T-42A aircraft
 Tactical Flying, Shooting and Instruction Departments (Taktik Uçuş, Atış ve Eğitim Bölümleri)Agusta Bell AB 204B, Bell UH-1H, Bell OH-58A Kiowa helicopters and Cessna U-17B aircraft
5th Main Maintenance Center (5. Ana Bakım Merkezi)
1st Army Aviation Regiment (1. Kara Havacılık Alayı)
Air Transport Group (Hava Ulaştırma Grubu)Beriev Be-200 amphibious aircraft, 421C Golden Eagle/Executive Commuter aircraft and Bell UH-1H, Aerospatiale AS 532-VIP, Aerospatiale AS 532UL Cougar helicopters
Ankara Gendarmerie Aviation Group Command (Ankara Jandarma Hava Grup Komutanlığı)
Headquarter (Karargah Kıtaatı)Cessna 182P Skylane aircraft and S-70A-17 helicopters
1st Helicopter Flight (1. Helikopter Filo)Augusta Bell AB 205 and S-70A-17 
2nd Helicopter Flight (2. Helikopter Filo)Mil Mi-17-1V (VIP, gunship and transport)

1993 airplane crash
Chief of the Gendarmerie, Gen. Eşref Bitlis departed on February 17, 1993, from the Güvercinlik Air Base aboard a Beechcraft B200 for an official trip. The aircraft crashed shortly after take-off. Bitlis, his aide-de-camp, the pilots and a technician were killed.

The pilot, who had VIP green card certification for excellence in flying, had switched the airplanes before the flight after having realized that the cockpit was not in order. The statement of the Chief of the General Staff, Gen. Doğan Güreş, that the accident on that snowy day was caused by atmospheric icing was denied by the crash investigators.

Other airports in Ankara
 Esenboğa International Airport
 Mürted Air Base
 Etimesgut Air Base

References

Airports in Turkey
Heliports in Turkey
Guvercinlik Air Base
Turkish Army air bases
Transport in Ankara Province